The Pretenders; Or, The Town Unmask'd is a 1698 comedy play by the English writer Thomas Dilke. It was first staged by Thomas Betterton's company at the Lincoln's Inn Fields Theatre with a cast that included John Thurmond as Lord Courtipell, Cave Underhill as  Sir Wealthy Plainder, Edward Kynaston as Sir Bellamour Blunt, John Bowman as Vainthroat, George Bright as Captain Bownceby, William Bowen as Nickycrack, Elizabeth Bowman as  Ophelia, Elinor Leigh as Sweetny, Abigail Lawson as Nibs and Elizabeth Willis as Doll.

References

Bibliography
 Van Lennep, W. The London Stage, 1660-1800: Volume One, 1660-1700. Southern Illinois University Press, 1960.

1698 plays
West End plays
Comedy plays
Plays by Thomas Dilke